Jochem Ziegert (born 25 July 1954 in Marburg) is a former German footballer.

Ziegert made a total of 176 appearances in the 2. Fußball-Bundesliga during his playing career. As a manager, Ziegert coached Hertha BSC II to the final of the 1992–93 DFB-Pokal.

References

External links 
 

1954 births
Living people
Sportspeople from Marburg
German footballers
Association football defenders
Association football midfielders
2. Bundesliga players
KSV Hessen Kassel players
Tennis Borussia Berlin players
Hertha BSC players
German football managers
Footballers from Hesse
West German footballers
West German football managers